The Taiwan Defense Alliance is a political party that appeared in Taiwan on 19 August 2004. It has called for the United States, which it considers the lawful occupier of Taiwan at the end of Pacific Theater of World War II, to take over Taiwan and include it as part of the U.S. defense system.

See also
 Taiwan independence
 Democratic Progressive Party

References

External links
 Taiwan Defense Alliance

Political parties in Taiwan
Taiwan independence movement